Bella Union is a British independent record label founded in 1997 by Simon Raymonde and Robin Guthrie of Cocteau Twins. It is now run solely by Raymonde.

History
After releasing records with 4AD for a large part of their career, Cocteau Twins decided to start up the Bella Union record label in 1997, through which they could release their own work as well as any collaborative efforts. The band split up not long after, but instead of letting the newly formed label go under, Robin Guthrie, Simon Raymonde and their former manager Fiona Glyn-Jones decided to take charge of it. One of the earliest bands to sign on was the Australian trio Dirty Three, who continue to release under Bella Union. Other early signees include Françoiz Breut and The Czars.

Since 2000, when Guthrie moved to France to concentrate on his own music, Raymonde took the reins at Bella Union.

In 2007, the 10th anniversary celebrations saw Bella Union host two nights at the Royal Festival Hall, with special guests Paul Weller, Romeo and Tom from Editors. Fionn Regan was nominated for a Mercury Prize Best Album Of The Year.

In 2008 and 2009, with signees Fleet Foxes successfully remaining in the chart for 100 weeks consecutively and having the biggest selling independent album of the year, the label achieved their first Platinum selling disc. The label has sold over a million Fleet Foxes albums to date.

The label has subsequently released music by Father John Misty, Beach House, Department of Eagles, Karl Blau, Explosions in the Sky, Fleet Foxes, The Acorn, Mercury Rev, Peter Broderick, PINS, M. Ward, Philip Selway, John Grant, Lawrence Arabia, The Low Anthem, Hannah Cohen, Laura Veirs, The Flaming Lips, Lanterns on the Lake, Inventions, John Tavener, Marissa Nadler, Arc Iris, Clarence Clarity, and Jambinai.

The label won the Independent Record Company Of The Year award at the Music Week Awards, as voted by the UK independent retailers, in 2010, 2012, 2014 and 2016.

In 2012, for the 15th anniversary the label took over the curation of one day at End of the Road Festival.

In 2014, signee John Grant was nominated for a Brit Award. In 2015, Raymonde signed the Yorkshire-born singer Holly Macve, releasing the single "Corner of my Mind". In 2016, artist Father John Misty was also nominated for a BRIT Award. In 2016, following his sold out show at Royal Albert Hall, artist John Grant received a Silver disc for the album Pale Green Ghosts.

The label's releases are distributed by the wholly independent distributors PIAS worldwide.

Artists

2:54
Aerial
Abe Vigoda
Al Brooker
Alessi's Ark
Andrew Bird
Arc Iris
Art of Fighting
The Autumns
Ballet School
Baloji
B.C. Camplight
Beach House
Bernard+Edith
Bikini Atoll
Bonnevill
Cashier No.9
Celebration
Chimes and Bells
Clarence Clarity
Concrete Knives
The Czars
The Dears
Decoder Ring
Department of Eagles
Departure Lounge
Devics
Dirty Three
Doomsquad
Drab City
Dustin O'Halloran
Emmy the Great
exmagician
Explosions in the Sky
Ezra Furman
Faraway Places
Father John Misty
Fiona Brice
Fionn Regan
The Flaming Lips
Fleet Foxes
Françoiz Breut
Garlic
Gwei-Lo
Hannah Cohen
Holly Macve
Horse Thief
Howling Bells
I Break Horses
Inventions
The Kissaway Trail
Jack Dangers
Jambinai
Jetscreamer
John Grant
John Tavener
Jonathan Wilson
Josh Martinez
Josh T. Pearson
J. Tillman
Karl Blau
Kid Loco
Landshapes 
Lanterns on the Lake
Laura Groves
Laura Veirs
Lawrence Arabia
Liela Moss
Lift to Experience
Lisa Dewey
Lone Wolf
Lost Horizons
The Low Anthem
Lost Horizons
Lowly
Mammút
Mandarin
Marissa Nadler
Mazarin
Mercury Rev
Midlake
Mountain Man
M. Ward
Mr Ben & the Bens
Mt.Royal
My Latest Novel
My Sad Captains
Nanaco
Ohbijou
Our Broken Garden
Pavo Pavo
Penelope Isles
Peter Broderick
Peter von Poehl
Phil Selway
PINS
Piroshka
Pom Poko
Poor Moon
Promise & The Monster
Robert Gomez
Rothko
Roy Harper
Russell Mills/Undark
Simon Raymonde
Sing-Sing
Sleeping States
Sneakster
Snowbird
Stephanie Dosen
Sumie
Susanne Sundfør
The Soft Cavalry
The Trouble With Templeton
Van Dyke Parks
The Venue
Tim Burgess
Tiny Ruins
Treefight for Sunlight
Veronica Falls
Vetiver
The Walkmen
Wild Nothing
Thousands
Xiu Xiu
Xylouris White
Zun Zun Egui

See also
 List of record labels

References

External links
 Official site

British independent record labels
Record labels established in 1997
Alternative rock record labels
1997 establishments in England